Nyanpkala is a community in Kumbungu District in the Northern Region of Ghana.

See also

References 

Communities in Ghana
Populated places in Kumbungu District